The Philippine Basketball Association (PBA) Mr. Quality Minutes is an annual Philippine Basketball Association (PBA) award given since the 1993 PBA season to the league's best performing player for his team coming off the bench as a substitute (or sixth man).  Unlike the traditional player awards, which is given by the league, this citation is awarded by the PBA Press Corps.

Since its inception, the award has been given to 24 individuals.

Winners

Multiple time winners

References

Mr. Quality Minutes
Awards established in 1993
1993 establishments in the Philippines